Slater is a city in Story County, Iowa, United States. The population was 1,543 at the time of the 2020 census.

History
There has been a post office in Slater since 1887. The city was named for Michael Slater, the original owner of the town site.

Geography
Slater is located at  (41.880265, -93.681642).

Demographics

2010 census
As of the census of 2010, there were 1,489 people, 589 households, and 418 families living in the city. The racial makeup of the city was 98.5% White, 0.3% African American, 0.2% Native American, 0.8% from other races, and 0.1% from two or more races. Hispanic or Latino of any race were 1.3% of the population.

There were 589 households, of which 35.5% had children under the age of 18 living with them, 60.8% were married couples living together, 6.5% had a female householder with no husband present, 3.7% had a male householder with no wife present, and 29.0% were non-families. 23.3% of all households were made up of individuals, and 9.7% had someone living alone who was 65 years of age or older. The average household size was 2.53 and the average family size was 3.02.

The median age in the city was 35.7 years. 26.5% of residents were under the age of 18; 7.5% were between the ages of 18 and 24; 29.5% were from 25 to 44; 24.1% were from 45 to 64; and 12.3% were 65 years of age or older. The gender makeup of the city was 51.7% male and 48.3% female.

2000 census
As of the census of 2000, there were 1,306 people, 532 households, and 369 families living in the city. The racial makeup of the city was 99.46% White, 0.31% African American, 0.15% Asian, and 0.08% from two or more races.

There were 532 households, out of which 34.6% had children under the age of 18 living with them, 61.7% were married couples living together, 5.8% had a female householder with no husband present, and 30.6% were non-families. 28.0% of all households were made up of individuals, and 13.9% had someone living alone who was 65 years of age or older. The average household size was 2.45 and the average family size was 3.03.

26.7% are under the age of 18, 6.4% from 18 to 24, 28.9% from 25 to 44, 24.0% from 45 to 64, and 14.0% who were 65 years of age or older. The median age was 38 years. For every 100 females, there were 94.1 males. For every 100 females age 18 and over, there were 85.8 males.

The median income for a household in the city was $45,417, and the median income for a family was $58,036. Males had a median income of $37,760 versus $27,031 for females. The per capita income for the city was $20,647. About 0.6% of families and 2.0% of the population were below the poverty line, including none of those under age 18 and 7.8% of those age 65 or over.

Education
The Ballard Community School District operates local area public schools.

See also
High Trestle Trail

References

Cities in Story County, Iowa
Cities in Iowa
1887 establishments in Iowa